Frances Lee McCain (born July 28, 1943) is an American actress.

Early life and education 
McCain was born in York, Pennsylvania and grew up in New York, Illinois and Colorado in addition to California. She graduated from Ripon College with a BA in Philosophy and then studied acting at the Central School of Speech and Drama in London, England. She completed a Master's degree in Psychology at the California Institute of Integral Studies in 2000.

Acting career 
She returned to New York City where she appeared on Broadway in Woody Allen's Play it Again Sam, and off-Broadway in Lanford Wilson's Lemon Sky, creating the role of Carol. She joined the American Conservatory Theater in San Francisco under William Ball and played a variety of roles in repertory.

Apple's Way TV show (1974–1975) and other 1970s work 
She began her career in film and television after appearing opposite Jon Voight and Faye Dunaway in A Streetcar Named Desire, eventually  co-starring with Ronny Cox as the female lead in the television series, CBS-TV's Apple's Way in 1974. She appeared in a variety of television series and miniseries throughout the 1970s, including Washington: Behind Closed Doors and the Quincy ME episode Eye Of The Needle playing a Holistic practitioner, and in "The Rockford Files" 1978 episode "The Prisoner of Rosemont Hall." In 1979, she appeared in Real Life.  In 1979, she appeared on ABC in the television series 13 Queens Boulevard.

1980s acting work 

In the 1980s, she was cast in several major films, usually playing the mother of a main character. In 1984, she co-starred in the film Gremlins as Lynn Peltzer, the mother of main character, Billy Peltzer. Also that year, she played Ethel McCormack, mother to Kevin Bacon's character, in Footloose. In 1985 she appeared in the film Back to the Future as Stella Baines, the mother of Lorraine Baines (Lea Thompson). In 1986, she played Mrs. Lachance, the mother of Gordie Lachance (Wil Wheaton), in the drama film Stand by Me.

Later work 
McCain continued to work in television after relocating to the San Francisco Bay Area in the late 1980s and also appeared in Scream (1996), as the mother of Rose McGowan and David Arquette's characters, and Patch Adams (1998).

She earned a Master's Degree in Psychology from the California Institute of Integral Studies in 2000, and continued to work in Theater extensively in the San Francisco Area until her relocation to Albuquerque, NM, in 2010. 

In 2004, McCain initiated a theater project based on oral histories of the blue-collar workers responsible for the building and maintaining of the Los Alamos National Laboratory in New Mexico which received workshop readings at the Lensic Center for Performing Arts in Santa Fe, New Mexico, and at the National Museum of the American Indian in Washington, D.C.

She is an Associate Artist of the ZSpace Studio in San Francisco, and is an ensemble member of the AlterTheater Ensemble in San Rafael, California.

Filmography

References

External links 

1943 births
20th-century American actresses
21st-century American actresses
Actresses from California
American film actresses
American television actresses
Living people
People from San Diego
People from the San Francisco Bay Area
Ripon College (Wisconsin) alumni